Skarfjellet is a  tall mountain in Sunndal Municipality in Møre og Romsdal county, Norway. The mountain is a popular rock climbing destination.

References

Mountains of Møre og Romsdal
Sunndal